Ilias Kyriakidis (born 5 August 1985) is a Greek former professional footballer.

Career
On 16 June 2007 Kyriakidis completed his move from AEK to AEL and earned 24 caps in 2007-2008 season. With AEK Athens he gained experience in Champions League matches. After 3 successful years with the Thessalian club, he decided to continue his career elsewhere, having plans to move away from Greece. His next team however, was Greek side Ergotelis. On 2 January 2011 he signed a new contract for two years and a half with the club.

In the summer of 2012, he dissolve his contract with Ergotelis and sign for free with the Bulgarian Lokomotiv Plovdiv. During Lokomotiv pre-season preparation, the owner of the club - Konstantin Dinev decided to resign and left the team in bad financial situation.

CSKA Sofia took advantage of the situation and on 27 July 2012 they signed Kyriakidis as a free agent. On 30 September 2012 he made his debut for CSKA in 3–1 home win against Etar Veliko Tarnovo. In August 2013, he returned to Greece and signed once more with AEL.

References

External links
 

1985 births
Living people
AEK Athens F.C. players
Athlitiki Enosi Larissa F.C. players
Ergotelis F.C. players
PFC Lokomotiv Plovdiv players
PFC CSKA Sofia players
Super League Greece players
First Professional Football League (Bulgaria) players
Expatriate footballers in Bulgaria
Association football midfielders
Footballers from Athens
Greek footballers
Greek expatriate sportspeople in Bulgaria
Greek expatriate footballers